The Movement of the Young Socialists (MJS) or simply Jeunes Socialistes is the youth organisation of the Socialist Party of France.

MJS was founded in 1993 as a formally independent youth organisation. However, its statutes commit the MJS to be generally supportive of its mother party. After a peak of around 10,000 members after the 2006 youth protests in France, MJS had 5321 members in November 2009.

MJS is member of the Young European Socialists (YES, formerly ECOSY) and International Union of Socialist Youth (IUSY).

Internal organization 
In a biannual general assembly called Congrès National, all members of MJS come together to discuss and decide on general positions as well as concrete projects. There, the members also directly elect the president for a two-year period and appoint the members of the national office.

Of several political currents within the MJS, a coalition of the centrist "Transformer à Gauche" (Transform to the left) and the Marxist "Offensive socialiste" (Socialist Offensive) dominated the 2009 Congress of Grenoble, successfully nominating Laurianne Deniaud for president. A minority movement of "Jeunes Socialistes pour la renovation" (Young socialists for renewal) and "La Relève" (The Uprise) calling for organizational changes including more transparency and grassroots democracy couldn't prevail, neither could the civil libertarian wing.

National congresses 
 1993: Congress of Avignon
 1995: Congress of Orléans
 1998: Congress of Toulon
 1999: Congress of Tours
 2001: Congress of Lille
 2003: Congress of Lamoura
 2005: Congress of Paris
 2007: Congress of Bordeaux
 2009: Congress of Grenoble
 2011: Congress of Strasbourg
 2015: Congress of Lille
 2018: Congress of Bondy

Presidents 
 1993-1995: Benoît Hamon
 1995-1997: Régis Juanico
 1997-1999: Hugues Nancy
 1999-2001: Gwenegan Bui
 2001-2003: Charlotte Brun
 2003-2005: David Lebon
 2005-2007: Razzy Hammadi
 2007-2009: Antoine Détourné
 2009-2011: Laurianne Deniaud
 2011-2013: Thierry Marchal-Beck
 2013-2015: Laura Slimani
 2015-2018: Benjamin Lucas
since 2018: Roxane Lundy

References

External links 
  

1993 establishments in France
Socialist Party (France)
Youth wings of political parties in France
Youth wings of social democratic parties